"Rebirth" is a song originally written and recorded by South Korean singer and record producer Yoon Jong-shin for his fifth studio album Woo (Stupid) in April 1996. Originally a retro-influenced doo-wop record composed by both Yoon and songwriter You Hee-yeol, the song was later rearranged by singer-songwriter Henry Lau as part of his collaboration with Yoon Jong-shin for the V Live-exclusive show Snowball Project in 2017. It was eventually given to girl group Red Velvet, who covered and released the song on August 18, 2017, through their label's STATION Season 2 project, becoming the twenty-first digital single for the season and seventy-second overall. It was also the group's second release through the digital project, after "Would U" in April 2017. The song achieved minor success, peaking at number seventy-eight and twenty-five on the Gaon Digital Chart and the Billboard World Digital Songs chart respectively, becoming their lowest charting single on both charts to date.

Background and release 
Together with Yoon Jong-shin and his artist Parc Jae-jung, Henry introduced Snowball Project – a show which "depicts the musical journey" of Parc Jae-jung and NCT's Mark through a special Naver V app video on June 28, 2017. This resulted in a collaboration between the two artists, titled "Lemonade Love", which was eventually released on July 21 as a digital single through SM Entertainment's STATION season 2. Both Henry and Yoon Jong-shin eventually continued the project with the plan to rearrange their other label's composition into new digital singles, with Henry recruiting Red Velvet and Yoon Jong-shin recruiting PERC%NT, Jang Jane and Giant Pink for the project. Henry eventually rearranged "Rebirth" for the girl group, while Yoon Jong-shin chose the group's 2015 hit single "Dumb Dumb" to rework. The group's rendition was eventually released as a single through SM Station on August 18, 2017, coinciding with the release of Mystic's rendition to "Dumb Dumb".

Music video 
A slow-motion video for the song was premiered on the same release day. Fellow labelmate Shindong from Super Junior took part in directing the music video, which depicts the members of Red Velvet play the roles of female students whose hearts start to race when their teachers enter the room.

Track listing

Credits and personnel 
Credits adapted from Melon.

 Red Velvet (Irene, Seulgi, Wendy, Joy, Yeri) – vocals, background vocals
 Yoon Jong-shin – original writer, producer
 Yoo Hee-yeol – producer
 JQ – songwriter
 Jin by Jin – arrangement
 Choi Jin-seok – vocal director, producer
 Henry Lau - vocal director
 Jung Ho-jin (sound POOL studios) – record director
 Jang Woo-young (doobdoob Studio) – digital editor
 Jung Eui-suk (SM Blue Cup Studio) – mixing engineer
 Sung Ji-hoon (JFS Mastering) – mastering engineer

Charts

Weekly chart

Release history

References 

1996 songs
2017 singles
Red Velvet (group) songs